Infurcitinea is a genus of the fungus moth family, Tineidae. Therein, it belongs to the Meessiinae, one of the larger fungus moth subfamilies.

Species
76 species were placed in Infurcitinea as of 2003, but new species are still being discovered regularly:

 Infurcitinea albanica G.Petersen, 1963
 Infurcitinea albicomella (Stainton, 1851) 
 Infurcitinea albulella (Rebel, 1935)
 Infurcitinea amseli G.Petersen, 1957
 Infurcitinea anatolica Petersen, 1968
 Infurcitinea arenbergeri Gaedike, 1988
 Infurcitinea argentimaculella (Stainton, 1849)
 Infurcitinea atrifasciella (Staudinger, 1871)
 Infurcitinea banatica G.Petersen, 1961
 Infurcitinea belviella Gaedike, 1980
 Infurcitinea brunneopterella G.Petersen, 1964
 Infurcitinea captans Gozmány, 1960
 Infurcitinea cyprica G.Petersen & Gaedike, 1985
 Infurcitinea fasciella Gaedike, 1983
 Infurcitinea finalis Gozmány, 1959
 Infurcitinea frustigerella (Walsingham, 1907)
 Infurcitinea gaedikei Baldizzone, 1984
 Infurcitinea gaedikella Nel, 2003
 Infurcitinea graeca G.Petersen & Gaedike, 1983
 Infurcitinea grisea G.Petersen, 1973
 Infurcitinea hellenica Gaedike, 1997
 Infurcitinea ignicomella (Heydenreich, 1851)
 Infurcitinea incertula (Meyrick, 1928)
 Infurcitinea iranensis G.Petersen, 1964
 Infurcitinea italica (Amsel, 1954)
 Infurcitinea karadaghica Zagulayev, 1979
 Infurcitinea karmeliella Amsel, 1935
 Infurcitinea karsholti Gaedike, 1992
 Infurcitinea kasyi G.Petersen, 1962
 Infurcitinea klimeschi Passerin d'Entrèves, 1974
 Infurcitinea lakoniae Gaedike, 1983
 Infurcitinea lambessella G.Petersen, 1958
 Infurcitinea litochorella G.Petersen, 1964
 Infurcitinea longipennis Zagulayev, 1979
 Infurcitinea luteella Forbes, 1931
 Infurcitinea marcunella (Rebel, 1901)
 Infurcitinea marianii (Rebel, 1936)
 Infurcitinea maroccana G.Petersen & Gaedike, 1979
 Infurcitinea maura G.Petersen, 1962
 Infurcitinea media (Walsingham, 1907)
 Infurcitinea megalopterella G.Petersen, 1964
 Infurcitinea minuscula Gozmány, 1960
 Infurcitinea monteiroi Amsel, 1957
 Infurcitinea nedae Gaedike, 1983
 Infurcitinea nigropluviella (Walsingham, 1907)
 Infurcitinea nuristanica G.Petersen, 1963
 Infurcitinea obscura G.Petersen, 1973
 Infurcitinea obscuroides Gaedike, 1983
 Infurcitinea ochridella G.Petersen, 1962
 Infurcitinea olympica G.Petersen, 1958
 Infurcitinea palpella Forbes, 1931
 Infurcitinea parentii G.Petersen, 1964
 Infurcitinea parnassiella Gaedike, 1987
 Infurcitinea peterseni Baldizzone, 1984
 Infurcitinea quettaella G.Petersen, 1971
 Infurcitinea raddei G.Petersen, 1958
 Infurcitinea rebeliella (Krone, 1907)
 Infurcitinea reisseri G.Petersen, 1968
 Infurcitinea roesslerella (Heyden, 1865)
 Infurcitinea rumelicella (Rebel, 1903)
 Infurcitinea safedella G.Petersen, 1973
 Infurcitinea sardica (Amsel, 1951)
 Infurcitinea sardiniella Vári, 1942
 Infurcitinea senecae Gaedike, 1987
 Infurcitinea siciliana G.Petersen, 1964
 Infurcitinea tauridella G.Petersen, 1968
 Infurcitinea taurus Gaedike, 1988
 Infurcitinea teheranensis G.Petersen, 1971
 Infurcitinea teriolella (Amsel, 1954)
 Infurcitinea toechophila (Walsingham, 1908)
 Infurcitinea tribertii Gaedike, 1983
 Infurcitinea turcica G.Petersen, 1968
 Infurcitinea vanderwolfi Gaedike, 1997
 Infurcitinea vartianae G.Petersen, 1962
 Infurcitinea walsinghami G.Petersen, 1962
 Infurcitinea yildizae Koçak, 1981

Synonyms
Many formerly independent genera have in more recent times been included in Infurcitinea. Some of them – e.g. Karsholtia, Omichlospora and Tineiforma – are still considered distinct by some authors today. But this seems hardly justified, as splitting off such small or even monotypic groups is liable to make Infurcitinea paraphyletic, and thus the following are usually treated as junior synonyms of the present genus:
 Atinea Amsel, 1954
 Atris Zagulayev, 1979
 Finalis Zagulayev, 1979
 Gozmanytinea Capuse, 1966
 Karsholtia Gaedike, 1986
 Microtinea Amsel, 1954
 Omichlospora Meyrick, 1928
 Pseudorumelis Sachkov, 1995
 Rumelis Zagulayev, 1979
 Tineiforma Amsel, 1952

Footnotes

References

  (2009): Infurcitinea. Version 2.1, 2009-DEC-22. Retrieved 2010-MAY-05.
  (2004): Butterflies and Moths of the World, Generic Names and their Type-species – Infurcitinea. Version of 2004-NOV-05. Retrieved 2010-MAY-05.
  [2010]: Global Taxonomic Database of Tineidae (Lepidoptera). Retrieved 2010-MAY-05.
  (2001): Markku Savela's Lepidoptera and some other life forms – Infurcitinea. Version of 2001-NBOV-04. Retrieved 2010-MAY-05.

Meessiinae